María Laura Raffo Degeronimi (born 22 September 1973) is a Uruguayan economist, businesswoman and politician of the National Party. She was the candidate for Intendant of Montevideo in the 2020 municipal elections of the Coalición Multicolor.

Born in Montevideo, she attended primary school at the Lycée Français of Montevideo, graduated from the University of the Republic with a Bachelor's of Economics, and has a Master's of Business Administration from the University of Montevideo.

Biography 
She is the daughter of Marta Degeronimi and Juan Carlos Raffo, a Uruguayan politician and writer, who served as a Senator, a National Representative and Ministry of Transportation and Public Works. She has two siblings, Verónica and Juan Carlos.

She worked as a columnist in the television program, Código País, broadcast by Teledoce. Between 2004 and 2008 she worked for Microsoft. She also worked on the radio with Elmer Araujo. In 2016 she published the book La Economía al alcance de todos (The Economy within everyone's reach). Since August 2021, she has been part of the panel of Todas las voces, a debate program broadcast by Channel 4.

Career 
She has held management positions in organizations such as Microsoft, Manpower, PGG Wrightson, Endeavor and ESPN, for various markets in the region, with 15 years of experience. From 2013 to 2017, she was a leading economist and image representative of Grupo Sura and was a member of the board of directors of the Banco Santander subsidiary from February 2018 to February 2020.

Political career 
In early February 2020, it was confirmed that Raffo would be the candidate for Intendant of Montevideo for the Coalición Multicolor in the 2020 municipal elections. In the following days, she was approved  conventions of the National, Colorado, Independent, Open Cabildo and De La Gente parties, members of the electoral coalition. The candidacy was made official on February 11, at the launch, Raffo stated that it is necessary to take care of "the problems of every day of the people".

On July 23, in the presentation of the government plan dedicated to cleaning up the city, the National Representative for Montevideo of the Ecologist Radical Intransigent Party, César Vega, officially supported Raffo stating that she  would be the "person who is going to do things better for Montevideo", and urged PERI voters to vote for her. 

The closing of the campaign was held on September 24 with an act in the Varela Square. On election day, Raffo obtained 39.3% of the votes, being the most voted individual candidate, but this percentage was not enough to obtain the government of Montevideo, due to the double simultaneous voting system.

On December 14, 2020, she was proclaimed president of the Montevideo Departmental Commission of the National Party, in a ceremony that was attended by Vice President Beatriz Argimón. On June 9, 2021, she launched the Centro de Estudios Metropolitano, with the purpose of "promoting a serious and professional debate" about what concerns Montevideo people."

References

External links 
 

Living people
University of the Republic (Uruguay) alumni
University of Montevideo alumni
Uruguayan economists
Uruguayan businesspeople
Uruguayan politicians
1973 births
21st-century Uruguayan women politicians
21st-century Uruguayan politicians
Uruguayan women in business
National Party (Uruguay) politicians